Charlice Hew Byrd (born September 14, 1951) is a Republican member of the Georgia House of Representatives who serves District 20 and parts of Cherokee County.

An elementary educator from New Orleans, Louisiana, she and her husband, Michael reside in Woodstock, Georgia and are members of First Baptist Woodstock.

She graduated from Southeastern Louisiana University.

Byrd is of Chinese descent.

References

Georgia General Assembly > House of Representatives > Charlice Byrd

Living people
Republican Party members of the Georgia House of Representatives
People from Woodstock, Georgia
Southeastern Louisiana University alumni
21st-century American women politicians
21st-century American politicians
Politicians from New Orleans
Women state legislators in Georgia (U.S. state)
1951 births
American women of Chinese descent in politics